Nyd or NYD may refer to:

 New Year's Day, first day of the new year
 New Years Day (band), an American rock band
 New York Dolls, another American rock band
 New York Dragons, American football team in the now defunct Arena Football League
 Ny Demokrati, Swedish political party (translates as New Democracy)
 Nyd (rune) (ᚾ), a rune of the Anglo-Saxon fuþorc and continuation of the Elder Fuþark naudiz